The Chicago Colleens were a women's professional baseball team who played in the All-American Girls Professional Baseball League from 1948 to 1951, evolving into a development team. The team was based Chicago, Illinois and played their home games at Shewbridge Field.

History
The Colleens joined the strong Eastern Division in the 1948 season and were managed by former Major League player Dave Bancroft. The team was the worst in the league, getting roughed up as a last-place expansion club with a 47–76 record, ending twenty nine and a half games out of the first place spot in the division. The only team to do worse, the Springfield Sallies of the Western Division, ended 41–84 in last place, 35.5 games out of 1st place. Both teams lost their franchises by the end of that season.

From 1949 through 1950, the Colleens and the Sallies became rookie development teams that played exclusively exhibition games. Their tours included contests at Griffith Stadium and Yankee Stadium. The team dissolved entirely by 1951.

AAGPBL executive Mitch Skupien, who later managed in the league, served as the general manager for both touring teams.

The team's 1948 games were broadcast regularly on television station WBKB in Chicago.

The ballpark
The Colleens played at Shewbridge Field. The ballpark was located at the corner of South Morgan and West 74th Streets on the South Side of Chicago, now part of the campus of the Stagg School of Excellence.

All-time roster

Manager
 Dave Bancroft, 1948

Manager–Chaperone
 Patricia Barringer, 1949, 1950

Chaperone
 Margaret Johnson, 1948

Sources
All-American Girls Professional Baseball League history
All-American Girls Professional Baseball League official website – Chicago Colleens seasons
All-American Girls Professional Baseball League official website – Manager/Player profile search results
All-American Girls Professional Baseball League Record Book – W. C. Madden. Publisher: McFarland & Company, 2000. Format: Hardcover, 294pp. Language: English. 
The Women of the All-American Girls Professional Baseball League: A Biographical Dictionary – W. C. Madden. Publisher:  McFarland & Company, 2005. Format: Softcover, 295 pp. Language: English. 
Golden Age Era Sports
 Margaret Johnson profile

References

All-American Girls Professional Baseball League teams
1948 establishments in Illinois
1951 disestablishments in Illinois
Baseball teams established in 1948
Baseball teams disestablished in 1951
Defunct baseball teams in Chicago
Defunct baseball teams in Illinois
Women's sports in Illinois
Women in Chicago